Leckhampstead is the name of more than one place.  It is an Anglo-Saxon name, meaning 'homestead where leeks are grown'.

In the United Kingdom:

Leckhampstead, Berkshire
Leckhampstead, Buckinghamshire